Sambar may refer to:

Sambar deer, a species of deer
Sambar (dish), a lentil-based dish common in India and Sri Lanka
 Sambar (film)
Sambhar, Rajasthan, a city and a municipality in Rajasthan, India
Sambhar Salt Lake, a lake in Rajasthan
Subaru Sambar, a kei-class van
David Sambar, a British American Lebanese international investment banker

See also
 Samba (disambiguation)